Sricharan Pakala is an Indian music composer who works in the Telugu films.

Early life and career

Pakala was born in Visakhapatnam into a Telugu-speaking family.

Pakala entered the film industry as a music director with the Telugu film KISS in 2013. He went on to become popular for his work as a music director. He made his acting debut with Krishna and His Leela (2020) for which he also composed music.

Discography

As composer

Score and soundtrack

As a singer

Film songs

Singles (Non-film)

References

External links

 

Telugu film score composers
Telugu playback singers
Living people
Indian male composers
Film musicians from Andhra Pradesh
21st-century Indian composers
Male film score composers
21st-century Indian male singers
21st-century Indian singers
People from Visakhapatnam
People from Visakhapatnam district
People from Andhra Pradesh
Musicians from Andhra Pradesh
Musicians from Visakhapatnam
Year of birth missing (living people)